Victor Olofsson (born July 18, 1995) is a Swedish professional ice hockey left winger currently playing for the Buffalo Sabres of the National Hockey League (NHL). Olofsson was selected by the Sabres in the 7th round, 181st overall, at the 2014 National Hockey League (NHL) Entry Draft. He is the younger brother of Jesper Olofsson, also a professional ice hockey player.

Playing career

Swedish Hockey League 
Olofsson made his Swedish Hockey League (SHL) debut playing with Modo Hockey during the 2013–14 season. At the conclusion of the 2015–16 season, Olofsson was unable to prevent Modo from relegation to the HockeyAllsvenskan. On April 3, 2016, Olofsson signed a two-year contract to remain in the SHL with Frölunda HC.

Buffalo Sabres 
At the conclusion of his contract with Frölunda HC following the 2017–18 season, Olofsson was signed to a two-year, entry-level contract with the Buffalo Sabres on April 24, 2018.

Olofsson made his NHL debut for the Sabres on March 28, 2019. He recorded an assist in a loss to the Detroit Red Wings. He scored his first NHL goal on the power play in his second game two days later in a loss to the New York Islanders. In the 2019–20 Buffalo Sabres home opener, on October 5, 2019, Olofsson scored two power play goals en route to a 7–2 victory over the New Jersey Devils. On October 14, 2019, Olofsson set a NHL record for scoring the first seven goals of his NHL career on the power play in a 4–0 shutout of the Dallas Stars.

Olofsson's impressive shot and ability to score have earned him the nickname Victor Goalofsson by the Buffalo fan base and the national media. He also began to put himself in the picture to be a candidate for the 2019–20 Calder Memorial Trophy, which is awarded to the NHL's rookie of the year. However, he endured a lower-body injury in a game against the Edmonton Oilers and was set to be out for 5–6 weeks.

Career statistics

Regular season and playoffs

International

Awards and honors

References

External links
 

1995 births
Buffalo Sabres draft picks
Buffalo Sabres players
Frölunda HC players
Living people
Modo Hockey players
People from Örnsköldsvik Municipality
Rochester Americans players
Swedish ice hockey right wingers
Timrå IK players
Sportspeople from Västernorrland County